Drop the Gun is the second full-length album from Japanese punk rock band 54 Nude Honeys, released on November 10, 1998.

Track listing

References

1998 albums
54 Nude Honeys albums